Bobby Greenwood may refer to:

 Bobby Greenwood (golfer) (born 1938), American golfer
 Bobby Greenwood (American football) (born 1987), American football offensive tackle